"Baila Mi Corazón" (My Heart Dances) is the lead single from Belanova's third studio album, Fantasía Pop. The song premiered on July 2, 2007 in Mexico, followed by release in Argentina, Spain, the United States and the rest of Latin America. The digital download was released on August 20. A pre-loaded bundle of audio and video tracks, including "Baila Mi Corazón", "Rock Star", "Vestida de Azul" and "Me Pregunto", was certified Platinum in Mexico for 100,000 units sold.

Music video

The video was filmed on July 13, 2007 in Mexico City and was directed by Oliver Castro, who also previously directed Belanova's "Por Tí" music video. It premiered on MTV Latin America on September 6. The video features the band playing the song on several paper-like animated backgrounds, that range from an open green field and a pink sky to a dark night and an open sea. The behind scenes of the music video were aired by TV Azteca on August 11.

Track listing
CD Single
 Baila Mi Corazón (Radio Edit) - 3:21
 Baila Mi Corazón (Album Version) - 3:36

Remixes (EP)
 Baila Mi Corazón (Mario Ochoa Remix) - 4:20
 Baila Mi Corazón (Mario Ochoa Remix Club) - 7:40
 Baila Mi Corazón (Tom Sawyer) - 4:39
 Baila Mi Corazón (Tom Sawyer Club Mix) - 6:36	
 Baila Mi Corazón (Mijangos Club 80s Mix Radio Edit) - 4:21
 Baila Mi Corazón (Mijangos Club 80s Mix) - 7:44
 Baila Mi Corazón (Imazué Latin Soul Mix Radio Edit) - 4:06
 Baila Mi Corazón (Imazué Latin Soul Remix Club) - 4:21		
 Baila Mi Corazón (Mijangos & Elorza Radio Edit) - 3:59
 Baila Mi Corazón (Mijangos & Elorza Bossa Club Mix) - 5:48

Single (Lounge Mix)
 Baila Mi Corazón (Lounge Mix) - 2:59

Charts

Certifications

References

2007 singles
Belanova songs
Spanish-language songs
2007 songs
Songs written by Denisse Guerrero
Songs written by Edgar Huerta
Songs written by Ricardo Arreola